Archibald Nicholas Alemania (born 6 March 1978), professionally known as Archie Alemania, is a Filipino actor, host, comedian, and dancer.

Career 
Alemania has appeared in several television commercials such as Chippy, San Miguel, Globe and Pop Cola. He is a talent of ABS-CBN and a member of Big Brother's Dance Group, Big Men Dance Group, and the Big Men Singers. At present, Archie is into sitcom, honing his talents as an actor.

Alemania has also been a host from 2004-2007 for Studio 23's weekly infotainment show and gag show Wazzup Wazzup with fellow hosts Toni Gonzaga and Vhong Navarro.

He moved to GMA Network in 2010. his first appearance in GMA is I Laugh Sabado until 2011 as a mainstay before his quick return to ABS-CBN.

after 4 years, he returned to GMA Network while he still appeared at two shows of ABS-CBN including Tubig at Langis and FPJ's Ang Probinsyano. Alemania is currently a mainstay of Bubble Gang since 2016. his first GMA Drama appearance is D' Originals.

Personal life 
He has a son with actress Mickey Ferriols named Brent Marcus Alemania. He married Gee Canlas in October 2018.

Filmography

Television

Film

References

External links 
 

1978 births
Living people
ABS-CBN personalities
GMA Network personalities
Filipino male comedians
Filipino male television actors
Star Magic personalities
Tagalog people
Converts to evangelical Christianity from Roman Catholicism
Filipino evangelicals